Winterveld is a large town in the Gauteng province of South Africa. The town is located at the north-western corner of the City of Tshwane Metropolitan Municipality, adjacent to Mabopane.

Notable residents
Stevens Mokgalapa, former Mayor of Tshwane                Dr Sam Motsuenyane Founder President of Nafcoc

References

Populated places in the City of Tshwane